Goodies is the sixth album by jazz guitarist George Benson recorded in 1968 and released on the Verve label.

Reception

AllMusic awarded the album 2 stars stating "Verve needed one more album from Benson after he signed with A&M/CTI, and ended up with a strange grab-bag in which Benson plays superbly throughout, whatever the odd goulash of sounds in back of him".

Track listing
All compositions by George Benson except as indicated
 "I Remember Wes" – 3:50
 "Carnival Joys" – 3:50
 "(You Make Me Feel Like) A Natural Woman" (Carole King, Gerry Goffin, Jerry Wexler) – 4:40
 "That Lucky Old Sun" (Beasley Smith, Haven Gillespie) – 3:37
 "Julie" – 3:10
 "Windmills of Your Mind" (Michel Legrand, Alan and Marilyn Bergman – 5:00
 "Doobie, Doobie Blues" – 5:10
 "Song for My Father" (Horace Silver) – 4:45
 "People Get Ready" (Curtis Mayfield) – 4:10

Personnel

Musicians
George Benson – guitar, vocals
Clark Terry – trumpet
Garnett Brown – trombone
Arthur Clarke – tenor saxophone, flute
George Marge – tenor saxophone, flute
Bobby Lucas – harmonica
Paul Griffin – piano, celeste
Bob Cranshaw – electric bass (tracks 4, 6–7)
Chuck Rainey – bass (tracks 1–3, 5, 8–9)
 Jimmy Johnson, Jr. – drums (tracks 4, 6–7)
Leo Morris – drums (tracks 1–3, 5, 8–9)
Jack Jennings – congas, vibraphone
The Sweet Inspirations –  vocals
The Winston Collymore Strings arranged and conducted by Horace Ott (tracks 2, 4, 5 & 7),

Technical
Esmond Edwards – producer
Val Valentin – engineering director 
Don Hahn – engineer
Barton Beneš – cover art
Stephen Stuart – photography
Del Shields – liner notes

References

1968 albums
George Benson albums
Albums produced by Esmond Edwards
Albums arranged by Horace Ott
Verve Records albums